Pāvels Veselovs (born July 15, 1983 in Rīga, Latvia) is a Latvian professional basketball player who plays the power forward position.

Pro career
He started his professional basketball career in 2000 with BK Gulbenes Buki. In the team he spent four seasons, the last of them already becoming a team leader. In summer of 2004 he joined the Latvian champion BK Ventspils, representing it till 2009. In February 2006 he was rented by Gulbenes team, but after the season returned to BK Ventspils. Together with BK Ventspils Veselovs twice has become a champion of Latvia.

In July 2011 he signed a contract with Cyprus League club Keravnos Strovolou. However, in the summer of 2012 he moved to Latvian League club BK Valmiera. After the season in Valmiera he joined other Latvian highest division club BK Jēkabpils.

Latvian national team
He has represented Latvia national team in EuroBasket 2007. Veselovs also has played for Latvia U-20 national team.

Pro clubs
2000—2004:  BK Gulbenes Buki
2004—2006:  BK Ventspils
2006:  BK Gulbenes Buki
2006—2009:  BK Ventspils
2009:  BC Cherno More Port Varna
2009—2010:  BK Prostejov
2010—2011:  BK Valmiera
2011—2012:  Keravnos Strovolou
2012—2013:  BK Valmiera
2013—present:  BK Jēkabpils

References

External links
FIBA Europe Profile
Eurocup Profile

1983 births
Living people
Latvian men's basketball players
Centers (basketball)
Power forwards (basketball)